During the 1997–98 English football season, Oldham Athletic A.F.C. competed in the Football League Second Division.

Season summary
In the 1997–98 season, Warnock was unable to achieve promotion with Oldham during the Division Two campaign and left after one disappointing year in charge, despite Oldham being in the play-off places until early March.

Final league table

Results
Oldham Athletic's score comes first

Legend

Football League Second Division

FA Cup

League Cup

Football League Trophy

Players

First-team squad
Squad at end of season

Transfers

In

Out

Transfers in:  £450,000
Transfers out:  £735,000
Total spending:  £285,000

References

Notes

Oldham Athletic A.F.C. seasons
Oldham Athletic